Hughes & Kettner is a German manufacturer of instrument amplifiers, cabinets and effects boxes.

History
The company was founded in Neunkirchen in 1984 by two brothers, Hans and Lothar Stamer, and moved to St. Wendel three years later.

It is cited as a "long and good standing reputation as a maker of solidly performing tube amplifiers".

In 1989, Hughes & Kettner offered the first realistic  speaker emulation device, the Red Box, providing the sound of a speaker without needing a microphone. In 1997, the company designed the Rotosphere, a tube-powered effects pedal simulating the sound of a rotary cabinet, similar to a Leslie, but in a much smaller form factor. It has been used by guitar players but also but some keyboard players, such as Jon Lord. In 2011, Music Radar named the Rotosphere as one of the best modulation and filter pedals of all time.

The company is actively producing new models, both tube and solid-state amplifiers. In 2020, the company released the 50W Spirit Nano amplifier head, which combines a transistor amplifier with a Red Box Leslie simulator. The era 1 and era 2 are general purpose amplifiers that are suitable for acoustic guitars and microphones.

Notable users
Notable users of Hughes & Kettner products include Rush's Alex Lifeson and Kiss' Tommy Thayer, who have signature amplifiers by the company (The TriAmp MKII Alex Lifeson and the Duotone Tommy Thayer). Marillion's Steve Rothery is a longtime user of the Rotosphere and prefers it to other Leslie simulators.

Other Hughes and Kettner users are Joel Stroetzel who has used the company's Rostophere, Adam Dutkiewicz, Joe Bonamassa, Peredur ap Gwynedd who uses a GrandMeister 36, Nuno Bettencourt, Tony Macalpine, Michael Wilton and Allan Holdsworth.

Hughes & Kettner made a custom rig of steampunk styled guitar amplifiers for Rush's Time Machine Tour in 2010.

External links

References

Guitar amplifier manufacturers
Sankt Wendel (district)
Companies based in Saarland
Audio equipment manufacturers of Germany
1984 establishments in West Germany
Companies established in 1984
German companies established in 1984